Stefan Grabiński (26 February 1887 – 12 November 1936) was a Polish writer of fantastic literature and horror stories. He is sometimes referred to as the "Polish Poe" or "Polish Lovecraft", although his works are often surrealistic or explicitly erotic in a way that sets him apart from both. He was an expert in parapsychology, magic and demonology and had an interest in the works of the German Expressionist filmmakers.

A number of his stories have been translated into English by Miroslaw Lipinski and published as The Dark Domain. His story "Szamota's Mistress" was adapted to film as part of a B Movie trilogy called Evil Streets.

Biography 
Grabiński was born in Kamionka Strumiłowa, then part of Poland (present-day Kamianka-Buzka, Ukraine), situated by the Bug River. His family was well off as his father, Dionizos, was a local judge, but Stefan's childhood was marred because of his proneness to various illnesses. He often read while lying in bed, which made him slightly reclusive and nurtured his bias in favor of dark fantasy and mysticism. After his father's death, the family moved to Lviv.

He graduated from the local high school in 1905, then studied Polish Literature and philology at the former Jan Kazimierz University, which is presently the Ivan Franko National University of Lviv. While a student there, he discovered that he had tuberculosis, which was common in his family. 

As he was an ardent pantheist, fond of Christian mysticism and Eastern religious texts, as well as Theosophy and demonology, this discovery only enhanced his occult worldview and approach to writing. Upon graduating in 1911, he began work as a secondary school teacher in Lviv. During this time, he also traveled extensively, visiting Austria, Italy, and Romania. From 1917 to 1927, he was a teacher in Przemyśl.

He first began to write short fiction in 1906 and his mother was his first reader and critic. A collection of short stories, Exceptions: In the Dark of Faith, written under the pen name Stefan Żalny (Żalny means 'doleful') became his self-published debut in 1909. These tales have never been judged highly. The general opinion being that his hyperbolical, at times anachronistic literary style couldn't be appreciated by the majority of his readers. His second volume of short stories, On the Hill of Roses, was published nine years later, and received modest critical approval.

However, this book impressed Polish decadent writer and literary critic Karol Irzykowski. They became good friends, and Irzykowski supported Grabiński's career. In 1920, Grabiński presented a collection of his mystic railway stories called The Motion Demon. Eventually, the following collections of short stories appeared: Pilgrim’s Madness (1920), An Incredible Story and The Book of Fire (1922). His longest prose work, Passion, written in 1930, was inspired by his trip to Italy, most notably Venice.

The symbolic imagery of Grabiński's works was embodied by eerie creatures, such as incubi, witches, doppelgängers, spirits of various sorts, and mysterious messages from the underworld. His fiction is usually considered bizarre because it is permeated with magic, occult eroticism, parapsychological effects, and Oriental mysticism.

A quote from his short story "", is said to reflect his usual state of mind: "I cannot free myself from that strong, commanding voice which speaks to me, or from that mysterious power which pushes aside objects, contemptuous of their size; I am still wearied by endless monotonous roads that led nowhere. That is why I am not a perfect spirit, only an 'insane person', someone who arouses in normal people pity, contempt or fear. But I do not complain. Even like this, I am better off than those of healthy mind.”

His tuberculosis worsened and he was forced to spend more time seeking treatment. In 1931, he settled in the resort and spa town of Brzuchowice (now Briukhovychi) where, despite some recent financial return for his writings, he increasingly fell into obscurity and was abandoned by most of his friends.

His work was largely forgotten until after World War II, when the literary historian  wrote a monograph on his work.

Bibliography

Novels
  (Salamander) (1924)
  (Baphomet's Shadow) (1926)
  (The Cloister and the Sea) (1928)
  (Itongo Island) (1936)

Short Stories
 "" (The Tawny Owl) (1906)
 "" (The Frenzied Farmhouse) (1908)
 "" (The Vampire) (1909)
 "" (The Earth's Revenge) (1909)
 "" (The Curse) (1909)
 "" (Death Knell) (1909) 
 "" (On the Hill of Roses) (1909) 
 "" (The Orchard of the Dead) (1909) 
 "" (At the Villa by the Sea) (1912) 
 "" (Shadow) (1913)
 "" (Fumes) (1913)
 "" (At Sara's House) (1915)
 "" (The Grey Room) (1915)
 "" (On a Tangent) (1918)
 "" (Strabismus) (1918)
 "" (The Problem of Czelawa) (1918)
 "" (The Siding) (1918)
 "" (Projection) (1919)
 "" (The Lady from the White Castle) (1919)
 "" (Ksenia) (1919)
 "" (Engine Driver Grot) (1919)
 "" (The Wandering Train) (1919)
 "" (Signals) (1919)
 "" (The Sloven) (1919)
 "Ultima Thule" (Ultima Thule) (1919)
 "" (Saturnin Sektor) (1920)
 "" (False Alarm) (1920)
 "" (King Nenufar) (1920)
 "" (The Miracle of Zywia) (1921)
 "" (Too Soon") (1921)
 "" (White Wyrak) (1922)
 "" (The Museum of Purgatorial Spirits) (1922)
 "" (The Strange Station) (1922)
 '"" (Vengeance of the Elementals) (1922)
 "" (Szamota's Mistress) (1922)
 "" (The Attic) (1930)
 "" (Reconciliation) (1930)
 "" (Nightmare) (1930) 
 "" (Projections) (1930)

Collections
  (From the Unusual. In the Shadows of Belief) (1909)
  (On the Hill of Roses) (1918)
  (The Motion Demon) (1919)
  (Mad Pilgrim) (1920)
  (An Eerie Tale) (1922)
  (The Book of Fire) (1922)
  (Passion) (1930)

Plays
  (Dark Forces)
  (All-Souls' Day)

Titles in English
Translated by Mirosław Lipinski:
 On the Hill of Roses, Hieroglyphic Press (2012) 
 The Dark Domain, Dedalus Classics (2013)  
 The Motion Demon, CreateSpace (2013)  
 Passion, NoHo Press (2014) 

Translated by Wiesiek Powaga:
 In Sarah's House'', CB Editions (2007)

See also
List of horror fiction authors

References

External links

 
Page at Internet Speculative Fiction Database
 
 The Dark Domain
 The Motion Demon 
 Grabinski on Facebook
 101 Weird Writers #45 — Stefan Grabiński
 Stefan Grabiński
 In search of Stefan Grabinski
 China Miéville bemoans the dearth of translations of Stefan Grabinski's pioneering horror fiction

1887 births
1936 deaths
20th-century deaths from tuberculosis
Polish horror writers
Polish male novelists
Polish male short story writers
Polish short story writers
20th-century Polish novelists
20th-century short story writers
20th-century Polish male writers
Tuberculosis deaths in Ukraine
Weird fiction writers